Santa Teresa is a municipality in the Carazo department of Nicaragua. It contains 42 communities.

Olympic middle-distance runner Edgar Cortez was born in Santa Teresa.

External links
Official Municipio de Santa Teresa website 

Municipalities of the Carazo Department